The hemopexin family is a family of evolutionarily related proteins. Hemopexin-like repeats occur in vitronectin and some matrix metalloproteinases family (matrixins). The HX repeats of some matrixins bind tissue inhibitor of metallopeptidases (TIMPs).

Hemopexin is a serum glycoprotein that binds haem and transports it to the liver for breakdown and iron recovery, after which the free hemopexin returns to the circulation. Hemopexin prevents haem-mediated oxidative stress. Structurally hemopexin consists of two similar halves of approximately two hundred amino acid residues connected by a histidine-rich hinge region. Each half is itself formed by the repetition of a basic unit of some 35 to 45 residues. Hemopexin-like domains have been found in two other types of proteins, vitronectin, a cell adhesion and spreading factor found in plasma and tissues, and matrixins MMP-1, MMP-2, MMP-3, MMP-9, MMP-10, MMP-11, MMP-12, MMP-14, MMP-15 and MMP-16, members of the matrix metalloproteinase family that cleave extracellular matrix constituents. These zinc endopeptidases, which belong to MEROPS peptidase subfamily M10A, have a single hemopexin-like domain in their C-terminal section. It is suggested that the hemopexin domain facilitates binding to a variety of molecules and proteins, for example the HX repeats of some matrixins bind tissue inhibitor of metallopeptidases (TIMPs).

Examples 
Human gene encoding proteins containing hemopexin-like repeats include:

 HPX (hemopexin, the founding member of this protein family)
 matrix metalloproteinases: MMP1, MMP2, MMP3, MMP8, MMP9, MMP10, MMP11, MMP12, MMP13, MMP14, MMP15, MMP16, MMP17, MMP19, MMP20, MMP21, MMP24, MMP25, MMP27, MMP28, 
 PRG4 (proteoglycan 4), and
 VTN (vitronectin).

References

Single-pass transmembrane proteins